was a professional Go player.

Biography 
Ohira was born in Gifu, Japan. Taken under the wing of the prolific Kitani Minoru in 1941, Ohira quickly rose in rank. By 1947, he had obtained professional 1 dan, being promoted to 2 dan in the same year. By 1955 he was 6 dan, and by 1963 he reached the peak of 9 dan. His first big break came in 1966 when he won the Nihon Ki-in Championship, and defended it for 3 years. Along with Takagawa Kaku, Sakata Eio, and Ishida Yoshio, Ohira was the only player to win this title. In 1977, he won his first major title by winning the Hayago Championship. Ten years later her set a new record of successive wins, with 17. During his time, he was an active player in the Meijin and Honinbo leagues. He lived in Yokohama, Japan before he died.

Titles & runners-up

Bibliography

External links
Nihon Ki-in profile (in Japanese)

1930 births
1998 deaths
Japanese Go players
Go (game) writers